Iłówiec  is a village in the administrative district of Gmina Brodnica, within Śrem County, Greater Poland Voivodeship, in west-central Poland.

The first mention of the village as the property of Komes Wisława Cohero Lodz comes from 1300. From 1975 to 1998, Iłówiec administratively belonged to Poznań Voivodeship.

References

Villages in Śrem County